is a passenger railway station in the town of Okutama, Tokyo, Japan, operated by the East Japan Railway Company (JR East). It is the western-most station in the Tokyo Metropolis.

Lines
Oku-Tama Station is the western terminus of the Ōme Line, located 37.2 kilometers from the starting point of the line at Tachikawa Station.

Station layout
The station has one island platform serving two dead-headed tracks. The station is attended.

Platforms

 
Holiday Rapid Okutama trains and irregular trains are departed/arrived from/at Track 2. The departure melodies are Donguri Korokoro, and differ between Track 1 and 2.

History
It was renamed Oku-Tama Station on 1 February 1971. It became part of the East Japan Railway Company (JR East) with the breakup of the Japanese National Railways (JNR) on 1 April 1987.

Route buses 
There are bus stops in Hikawa barn which Nishi Tokyo Bus has in the front of the station.

Passenger statistics
In fiscal 2019, the station was used by an average of 966 passengers daily (boarding passengers only).

The passenger figures for previous years are as shown below.

Surrounding area
Okutama Town Hall
Tama River

See also
 List of railway stations in Japan

References

External links 

  

Railway stations in Tokyo
Ōme Line
Stations of East Japan Railway Company
Railway stations in Japan opened in 1944
Okutama, Tokyo